Westerfield railway station is on a branch line off the Great Eastern Main Line, in the East of England, serving the village of Westerfield, Suffolk. Its three-letter station code is WFI.

The station was opened in 1859 and is located on the south side of the small village of Westerfield. Patronage has never been high and it may be the fact that its location as a junction of two branches has been partly responsible for keeping it open. Notwithstanding its low usage, a report commissioned by Suffolk County Council reported that 25,384 people lived in the catchment area for the station.

Westerfield station is currently managed by Greater Anglia, which also operates all trains serving the station. Services are typically formed of  trains. Behind the Ipswich-bound platform the original platform and station building of the Felixstowe Dock & Railway Company can still be seen.

History
The Ipswich & Bury Railway was absorbed by the Eastern Union Railway in 1847, which gathered a number of the smaller railway concerns together.

The East Suffolk Railway, which had been incorporated on 3 July 1854, took over the powers of the Halesworth, Beccles & Haddiscoe Railway and the route opened on 4 December 1854.

On 1 June 1859 the line was opened as far south as Westerfield and Ipswich and north to Yarmouth Southtown. In 1862 the Great Eastern Railway took over operation of the line. In 1877 the Felixstowe Branch Line opened. Like so many schemes of the time it foundered and died a natural death.

During the 1880s the station served a factory belonging to the Westerfield Steam Brewery (which also dealt in coal and corn). Coal merchant Thomas Moy was listed as operating in 1896 and 1900.

On 25 September 1900, at 8:45 am, GER Class Y14 0-6-0 locomotive No. 522 which was then just a year old, stopped at a signal on the Ipswich side of the level crossing awaiting a route to the Felixstowe branch. Shortly afterwards the boiler exploded, killing driver John Barnard and his fireman William MacDonald, both based at Ipswich engine shed. The boiler was thrown 40 yards forwards over the level crossing and landed on the down platform. Apparently the locomotive had a history of boiler problems although in the official report the boiler foreman at Ipswich engine shed was blamed. The victims were buried in Ipswich cemetery and both their gravestones have a likeness of a Y14 0-6-0 carved onto them.

On 3 May 1902 Westerfield almost became a four-way junction when a sod cutting ceremony for the Mid-Suffolk Light Railway was held adjacent to the north side of the goods yard. The original plan was to link up with the Mid-Suffolk Railway at Debenham and a short section of this line was built at the Debenham end. It was never completed.

No scheduled services did this.

In 1923 the Great Eastern Railway was merged into the London and North Eastern Railway. During World War II a number of engines were stored in the bay platforms but returned to use later in the war. These included three of the regular Felixstowe branch engines Nos. 6123, 6128 and 6130 (C14 4-4-2T). It was also where Polish armoured train C was based.

In 1948 the railways were nationalised and Westerfield Junction became part of the Eastern Region of British Railways. During the winter months in the 1950s a pair of camping coaches were stored in the goods yard. These were based at  during the summer. In the 1960s, as part of the Beeching cuts, the East Suffolk Line was marked for closure but a vigorous local campaign saw it saved. It was reduced to a very basic railway in order to cut costs although some through-services to London survived until the 1980s.

On 13 July 1964 the goods yard closed with the track in the bay platforms being lifted sometime later in the 1960s. In 1967 all booking offices in the area closed and all trains became operated by conductor guards. The late 1960s saw the steady growth of freight through Felixstowe with Freightliner trains being seen increasingly through Westerfield.

In 1985 the layout was changed in connection with the introduction of Radio Electronic Token Block signalling. Trains for Felixstowe now changed tracks west of the level crossing and worked through the Ipswich-bound platform. Westerfield's signal box remained as the Felixstowe branch was still signalled under the Absolute Block system. The signal box closed in 1999 and the Felixstowe branch was controlled by the Colchester Power Signal Box under the Track Circuit Block system of signalling. In the early 1990s the Felixstowe Dock & Railway Company buildings which had stood derelict for many years were converted to a private residence.

On privatisation in 1994 the ownership of the infrastructure passed to Railtrack (which was replaced by Network Rail in 2002), whilst management of the station, as well as the services serving it, were initially operated by a business unit and the first franchise was awarded to Anglia Railways. The second round of franchising in 2004 saw the One franchise owned by National Express take over; this was renamed National Express East Anglia in 2008.

Operations
In 1877 the station opened as a terminus of the Felixstowe Branch Line with four trains arriving and departing each day. The bay platforms were built for this purpose, as was the office for the Felixstowe Dock & Railway Company.

The 1905 timetable reported through-coaches for Felixstowe from London Liverpool Street being detached at Westerfield where another locomotive would then have been attached to the coaches for the journey down to Felixstowe.

In June 1922 there were seven weekday services to the East Suffolk Line and ten to the Felixstowe branch. On Sundays there were two services to the East Suffolk and six to the Felixstowe line.

In the September 1964 timetable only four Felixstowe and a single East Suffolk train served the station on a weekday.

Through-services to Liverpool Street finished in 1984 although they were restarted after privatisation in 2004, ceasing again in 2010.

During 2012 it became a request stop on the East Suffolk line.

Description

The station is situated to the east of the Ipswich to Westerfield Road which crosses the East Suffolk Line on the level. The station building is situated on the southern side of the East Suffolk Line. There were two through-platforms when the station opened and these were supplemented by two further bay platforms when the Felixstowe Branch Line opened in 1877. The Felixstowe Railway Company had offices on the southernmost platform which are still extant today as a private residence after they had stood derelict for many years.

The goods yard was situated on the northern side of the line and consisted of a couple of sidings accessed by setting back from the main line.

To the west of the station and level crossing there was a short branch (1.5 miles long) which ran to a brick and tile works in what is now known as the Dales area of Ipswich. There was a second brick works just north of Grove Farm. In World War I the line was requisitioned by the government to serve a munitions depot in the Upper Dales. In 1921 the line was worked by a Garrett steam road tractor as the track was in poor condition and it was removed in about 1927.

The original signal box was situated at the east end of the Lowestoft platform but this was replaced by a standard Great Eastern structure located at the junction for the Felixstowe branch. Absolute Block signalling was withdrawn between Westerfield and Oulton Broad when the East Suffolk Line was upgraded to the Radio Electronic Token Block system. The box survived as the Felixstowe branch still had conventional block signalling with the next box being at  albeit with a large modern radio mast inelegantly attached to a Victorian structure. The box finally closed in when the signalling was upgraded in 1999 and the area is now controlled by Colchester Power Signal Box.

Services

Passenger trains serving Westerfield are currently operated by Greater Anglia. These services typically call once every hour.

East Suffolk Line trains between Ipswich and  generally only call during the weekday peak hours. There are 4 trains a day in the up (from Lowestoft) direction: 3 in the morning peak and the last train of the day from Lowestoft, and 4 in the down (towards Lowestoft) direction: 2 in the morning (the first of these trains terminates at Saxmundham), and 2 in the evening.
The only East Suffolk Line train to stop at Westerfield on Saturdays is the 21:07 service from Lowestoft to Ipswich, the last train of the day in that direction. There is a full service on Sundays.

 the typical weekday service at Westerfield is as follows:

No freight is handled at Westerfield but freight trains do pass through as the Felixstowe branch is busy with goods trains for the port of Felixstowe operated by DB Schenker, Freightliner and GBRf. Direct Rail Services also operate a less frequent service to Sizewell nuclear power station.

References

External links
1960 signal box diagram - https://signalbox.org/~SBdiagram.php?id=%201311

Railway stations in Suffolk
DfT Category F2 stations
Railway stations in Great Britain opened in 1859
Former Great Eastern Railway stations
Greater Anglia franchise railway stations